Sławomir Kohut (born 18 September 1977, in Cieszyn) is a Polish former professional cyclist.

Major results

2000
 3rd Overall Tour of Bulgaria
2001
 2nd Time trial, National Road Championships
 3rd Firenze–Pistoia
2002
 3rd Overall Course de la Solidarité Olympique
2003
 2nd Overall Course de la Solidarité Olympique
 3rd Time trial, National Road Championships
2004
 1st  Time trial, National Road Championships
 1st Overall Bałtyk–Karkonosze Tour
1st Stage 5
 1st Stage 4 Settimana Ciclistica Lombarda
 2nd Overall Peace Race
1st Stage 6
 2nd Overall Course de la Solidarité Olympique
 2nd Tartu GP
2008
 2nd Overall Tour du Maroc

References

External links

1977 births
Living people
Polish male cyclists
Cyclists at the 2004 Summer Olympics
Olympic cyclists of Poland
People from Cieszyn
Sportspeople from Silesian Voivodeship